Robert Clare (born 28 February 1983) is an English former professional footballer who played as a defender.

Playing career
Clare was born in Belper, Derbyshire. He began his career at Stockport County, where he had progressed through the Centre of Excellence youth system, making his debut as a substitute in a 4–1 defeat at Fulham. He spent one season at Blackpool, before re-joining Stockport.

In August 2004, Clare received a call-up to the England Under-21 squad for their friendly against Ukraine. He was an unused substitute. He played twice for the England under 20 team.

During the 2006–07 season, Clare was part of the Stockport County side that set a record for winning nine games in a row without conceding. He was notable for playing every minute of that nine-game run.

Post-playing career
In June 2008, Clare was released from his contract with Stockport County after an injury-plagued year. Injury forced Clare to retire prematurely at the age of 25. He pursued referee and coaching qualifications. He is married and has four children.

References

External links
 
 
 Profile at stockportcounty.co.uk

1983 births
Living people
People from Belper
Footballers from Derbyshire
English footballers
Association football defenders
Stockport County F.C. players
Blackpool F.C. players